The MTV Video Music Award for Song of Summer was first given out in . It is a social media voted award to crown the song of the summer as determined by fans online.

Recipients

References 

MTV Video Music Awards
Awards established in 2013